Norbert Németh (born 5 May 1981) is a Hungarian former football player.

Career
On 4 March 2009 Tom Tomsk bought the Hungarian midfielder Nemeth, who had left Vasas in mid-February for a trial period with the Russian club.

International
Németh also has two appearances with the National Hungarian team.

External links
 Profile 

1981 births
Footballers from Budapest
Living people
Hungarian footballers
Hungary international footballers
Association football midfielders
Budapest Honvéd FC players
Marcali VFC footballers
Győri ETO FC players
MTK Budapest FC players
Újpest FC players
Vasas SC players
FC Tom Tomsk players
Egri FC players
ŠK 1923 Gabčíkovo players
Nemzeti Bajnokság I players
Russian Premier League players
Austrian Regionalliga players
Hungarian expatriate footballers
Expatriate footballers in Russia
Hungarian expatriate sportspeople in Russia
Expatriate footballers in Slovakia
Hungarian expatriate sportspeople in Slovakia
Expatriate footballers in Austria
Hungarian expatriate sportspeople in Austria